The 2013 Enterprise Cup was the 75th time that the Enterprise Cup has been contested.

Fixtures and results

2013
2013 in African rugby union
2013 rugby union tournaments for clubs
2013 in Kenyan sport
March 2013 sports events in Africa